Bears in Trees are an English rock band from Croydon, South London, England.

The band tend to reject genre labels, preferring to call themselves a 'dirtbag boyband.'

In October 2020, Bears in Trees announced that they had been signed by Boston label Counter Intuitive Records.

History 
Childhood friends Callum Litchfield and Iain Gillespie formed the band in 2014 after the dissolution of their previous project, The November Criminals, which also included Bears in Trees guitarist Nick Peters. Litchfield met George Berry, originally brought on board to mix and record their songs, at college. Berry has since also become the band's drummer.

The band's name was developed from a name generator's suggestions.

Musical influences 
The band cite Fall Out Boy, The Front Bottoms, Modern Baseball, The Wombats, Walk the Moon, The 1975, Dodie and Cavetown as their main influences, but have also referred to many others on their social media.

Band members 
George Berry – drums, percussion, and the band's producer. Berry graduated from the Academy of Contemporary Music with a first class honours degree in professional music production.
Iain Gillespie – vocals, bass guitar, lyrics. 
Callum Litchfield – vocals, ukulele, piano. Litchfield is a classically trained flautist.
Nick Peters – guitar and lyrics. Peters runs most of the band's social media.

Discography

Albums/EPs

Let's Sleep On It (2015) 
Bears in Trees released their first collection of songs on 1 September 2015. The band has since removed Let's Sleep On It from all streaming services except Bandcamp, because they say the album doesn't "accurately reflect [their] sound anymore". The final two songs on the album are listed on Bandcamp as bonus tracks.

Track listing:

Just Five More Minutes (2017) 
Bears in Trees released their debut album, Just Five More Minutes, on 14 August 2017. Tracks 1–11 were produced by Berry, and track 12 by Absolex. Joe Matthews provided the trumpet for this album.

Bears in Trees call their fans "sandboxes", a reference to the song "The Sandbox One". "Good Rhymes for Bad Times" was the album's pre-release single.

Track listing:

Bits n' Pieces (2017) 
This EP was released on 30 December 2017. Mikey Tree of deafpony provided the guitar on "Alone in the Basement". "Fyaaa" is only available on Bandcamp.

Track listing:

I See Blue (2019) 
I See Blue was released on 23 August 2019. This EP once again reflects upon the band's time at university. The song 'I Am Cold' contains repeated references to Catch-22, Peters' favourite book.

Track listing:

I Want To Feel Chaotic (2020) 
All the songs on the I Want To Feel Chaotic EP were released individually as singles before the EP's complete release on 5 June 2020. This EP is the band's first release under the Counter Intuitive label. The band refers to this period of single releases as the I Want To Feel Chaotic era. The band have said that this EP is about “coming to terms with the worst parts of your personality—with the things that scare you, with the things that keep you awake at night… with the deaths of your friends, and the slow acceptance that you are deserving of love.” "Reverberate" also contains references to Catch-22.

Track listing:

Keep Me Safe (2020) 
As with companion EP I Want To Feel Chaotic, the Keep Me Safe EP heralded a new era for Bears in Trees. Each song was released individually as a single before the EP's complete release on 11 December 2020 with Counter Intuitive.

Track listing:

Flower Through Concrete (2021) 
Flower Through Concrete was released on 14 May 2021 with Counter Intuitive. The band's first professionally produced music video, for "Fresh Concrete", was directed by Rakesh Jaitly and was released on 17 May 2021.

Track listing:

and everybody else smiled back (2021) 
Bears in Trees announced their first full-length studio album under Counter Intuitive Records, and everybody else smiled back, on 16 September 2021. The album was released on 19 November. The lead single, "Great Heights", was also released on 16 September. The next single, "I'm Doing Push Ups", was released on 8 October. The album's third and final single, "Little Cellist", was released on 5 November. Accompanying videos, also directed by Jaitly, were uploaded on 18 September and 9 October, respectively. The "Little Cellist" video was released on 6 November; unlike the band's previous videos, it was directed by Jamie Benyon. It is also their first video not to show the band. The video for "Heaven Sent Is A Coffee Cup", directed and produced by Stefan Gutierrez Yildirim, was released on 9 December. "Mossy Cobblestone" also includes a reference to Catch-22, with the lyric "I'll live forever or die in the attempt."

Every Moonbeam, Every Feverdream (2022) 

Every Moonbeam, Every Feverdream is an EP that was released on 11 November 2022. The first single, "Kind Love", was released on 7 October 2022, accompanied by a video later that day. The second single, "Doing This Again!", was released on 28 October 2022, also with a video uploaded to YouTube that day. The description of the video mentions that the band opted to record and edit it themselves on a compact camera reminiscent of their earlier music videos, as opposed to the more professional music videos they've had since the release of Fresh Concrete. The EP was inspired by the film Tick, Tick... Boom!. The band described the EP as being about "walks under street lamps and goodbyes and nights spent quiet after days that won't end, moonlight, and those days where you wish you didn't have a body."

Track listing:

Singles

"Fly Out To Alaska" (2018) 
Bears in Trees recorded the song, released as a single on 8 November 2018, in the AutoHeart Studios in Vienna. The video was also filmed during the band's time in Vienna. Austrian slang is included in a call-and-response section of the song; Nah oida! Leiwand! roughly translates to "hey man! It's cool!"

"Sitting Pretty" (2019) 
"Sitting Pretty" was released on 11 February 2019.

"Precipitation" (2022) 
"Precipitation" was released on 2 June 2022.

"No Point Pretending (Song for Tour)" (2023)

"No Point Pretending" was released on 7 March 2023, as a collaboration with NOAHFINNCE.

Tours

UK Tours 
Bears in Trees had their debut UK tour in mid-2021. The tour was originally due to take place in December 2020, but was postponed due to the COVID-19 pandemic. Since then, Bears in Trees have also toured the UK with NOAHFINNCE, and had their second UK tour in February 2022 with support from Lucy Blue, who toured alongside them. Bears in Trees also played a number of festivals in summer 2022, headlining many. They are set to go on their third UK tour, "The Moonbeam Tour", in November 2022, with support from Misery Kids and Me Rex. They are playing "the smallest UK shows [they'll] play in a long time." Bears in Trees opened for You Me at Six on their "Truth Decay Tour" in February 2023, alongside Waterparks and The Maine.

US Tours 
Bears in Trees went on their first US tour in March 2022, when they supported Just Friends. They played their first east coast North American headline tour, "The Feverdream Tour", in November and December 2022. They were supported by Chase Petra and Cry Baby. They will be supporting NOAHFINNCE in April 2023.

References

English boy bands
English rock musicians
English indie rock groups
English punk rock groups